Joel Whitford (born 7 January 1993) is a professional Canadian football punter for the Montreal Alouettes of the Canadian Football League (CFL).

College career
Whitford played college football for the Santa Barbara City College Vaqueros in 2015. After sitting out the 2016 season, he joined the Washington Huskies and played for the team from 2017 to 2019.

Professional career

Hamilton Tiger-Cats
Whitford was drafted in the first round, eighth overall by the Hamilton Tiger-Cats in the 2021 CFL Global Draft and signed with the team on 28 April 2021. Following 2021 training camp, he won the job as the team's punter and played in his first career professional game on 5 August 2021, against the Winnipeg Blue Bombers. He played in 12 regular-season games and had 68 punts with a 45.1-yard average. He began the 2022 season on the practice roster before being released on June 27, 2022.

Montreal Alouettes
On July 8, 2022, Whitford signed with the Montreal Alouettes.

References

External links
 Montreal Alouettes bio

1993 births
Living people
American football punters
Australian players of American football
Australian players of Canadian football
Canadian football punters
Hamilton Tiger-Cats players
Montreal Alouettes players
Santa Barbara City Vaqueros football players
Sportsmen from Victoria (Australia)
Washington Huskies football players